Joan Margaret Monahan (née Hastings, 27 February 1925 – 6 April 2004) was a New Zealand swimmer, botanist and school teacher.

Born in 1925, Hastings was educated at Auckland Girls' Grammar School and Auckland University College, from where she graduated Master of Science with first-class honours in 1950. Her thesis was titled A fungal disease of Meryta sinclairii.

At the 1950 British Empire Games she won the silver medal as part of the women's 440 yard freestyle relay. Her teammates in the relay were Norma Bridson, Winifred Griffin and Kristin Jacobi.

She worked as a botanist at the Forest Research Institute, and later returned to teach at Auckland Girls' Grammar School. She retired as head of science there in 1979.

In her later years, Hastings was active in Masters swimming, and broke several world Masters records, including the 1500 m world record for the 60–64 years category in 1987, and numerous New Zealand Masters records.

References

1925 births
2004 deaths
People educated at Auckland Girls' Grammar School
University of Auckland alumni
20th-century New Zealand botanists
New Zealand schoolteachers
New Zealand female swimmers
Swimmers at the 1950 British Empire Games
Commonwealth Games silver medallists for New Zealand
Commonwealth Games medallists in swimming
Swimmers from Auckland
New Zealand women botanists
20th-century New Zealand women scientists
Medallists at the 1950 British Empire Games